Isembard, also spelled Isembart, Isembert or Isambard, may refer to:

Isembard (vassal of Charlemagne), a leader of the Reconquista campaign of 805
Isembard, Count of Autun (floruit 850–59), Burgundian nobleman and count of Autun
Isembart de Broyes, bishop of Orléarns (1033–63)
Isembert I, bishop of Poitiers (1021–47)
Isembert II, bishop of Poitiers (1047–87)

See also
 Gormond et Isembart, a medieval epic poem
 Isambard
 Isambart